Williams College is a private liberal arts college in Williamstown, Massachusetts.

Williams College may also refer to:

 George Williams College (Chicago) in Chicago, Illinois
 Roger Williams University in Bristol, Rhode Island
 Sir George Williams University in Montreal, Quebec
 St William's College, a mediaeval building in York, England
 Williams Baptist College in Walnut Ridge, Arkansas
 Williams College in Berkeley, California, founded by Cora Lenore Williams